The Ides of March is an American jazz rock band that had a major US and minor UK hit with the song "Vehicle" in 1970. After going on hiatus in 1973, the band returned with their original line-up in 1990 and has been active since then.

Career

Early days 
The Ides of March began in Berwyn, Illinois (a near western suburb of Chicago), on October 16, 1964, as a four-piece band called "The Shon-Dels". Their first record, "Like It or Lump It", was released on their own "Epitome" record label in 1965.

In 1966, after changing their name to The Ides of March (a name suggested by bassist Bob Bergland after reading Shakespeare's Julius Caesar in high school), the band released their first single on Parrot Records, "You Wouldn't Listen". The song reached No. 7 on WLS Chicago on June 17, 1966, and No. 42 on the Hot 100 on July 23–30, 1966. This record and its follow-ups (all pre-"Vehicle") have been re-released on the Sundazed Records CD Ideology.

In early 1967, trumpeter Steve Daniels was added. He was succeeded in late 1969 by two horn players, John Larsen and Chuck Soumar, with Bergland often doubled up on tenor saxophone.

Parrot singles:
 "You Wouldn't Listen" / "I'll Keep Searching" (Parrot 304) 1966 (reached No. 7 in Chicago)
 "Roller Coaster" / "Things Aren't Always What They Seem" (Parrot 310) 1966 (reached No. 14 in Chicago)
 "You Need Love" / "Sha-La-La-Lee" (Parrot 312) 1966
 "My Foolish Pride" / "Give Your Mind Wings" (Parrot 321) 1967
 "Hole in My Soul" / "Girls Don't Grow on Trees" (Parrot 326) 1967**
(** these are the only two tracks they recorded in stereo during the Parrot years)

Kapp single:
 "Nobody Loves Me" / "Strawberry Sunday" (Kapp 992) 1968

Ray Herr, a folk singer who had been gigging with another local outfit, the Legends of Time, joined the Ides as alternate lead singer (alongside Peterik) and rhythm guitarist. This allowed Peterik to concentrate on lead guitar. Herr first appeared on "Girls Don't Grow on Trees" in 1967.

Like Columbia's The Cryan' Shames, they had local success in the Chicago area without much label support. Unlike the Cryan' Shames, who issued three albums on Columbia, Parrot never scheduled an album for the Ides of March.

Success 
Having secured a recording contract with Warner Bros. Records in 1970 the band released the track "Vehicle", which allegedly became the fastest-selling single in Warner's history. Fourteen seconds of the completed "Vehicle" master tape (primarily the guitar solo) were accidentally erased in the recording studio. The missing section was spliced in from a previously discarded take.

The song reached No. 2 on the Billboard Hot 100 and No. 6 on the corresponding Cash Box listings. It sold over one million copies, and was awarded a gold disc in November 1972. The following album, Vehicle, reached No. 55 nationally.

The band toured extensively throughout 1970 in support of many top acts, including Jimi Hendrix, Janis Joplin and Led Zeppelin. The Ides of March were also among the participants in the "Festival Express" train tour documented in a 2003 film, although they were not featured in the film.

During the summer of 1970, Ray Herr was forced to leave the Ides to investigate his status with the local draft board. He changed his name to Ray Scott and formed the short-lived group Orphanage before relocating to Nashville to pursue a career in country music.

In 1971, the band released their second album Common Bond. The featured single was "L.A. Goodbye". The song was at No. 1 on regional charts for five weeks, No. 2 on WCFL Chicago, No. 5 on WLS Chicago, but only No. 73 on the Billboard Hot 100.

In 1972, the band moved to RCA Records and released World Woven. At this point, the band departed from the "brass" sound (though one song featured a single trumpet) and the album produced no hit singles.

In 1973, the Midnight Oil album was released. The band played its final show of their "first era" at Morton West High School in Berwyn that November.

Split 
Between 1973 and 1990, The Ides of March went on an extended hiatus, during which Jim Peterik co-founded the band Survivor and co-wrote all of their platinum hits including "Eye of the Tiger", "The Search Is Over", "High on You" and "I Can't Hold Back".

He also began a career of writing collaborations which resulted in many platinum hits for other artists, most notably "Hold on Loosely", "Rockin' into the Night", "Caught Up in You", "Fantasy Girl" and "Wild-Eyed Southern Boys" for .38 Special and "Heavy Metal" for Sammy Hagar.

The Ides And Shames Union 
In 1974, Larry Millas and Chuck Soumar wanted to get back to touring. With the help of Colombia Records Promo men Dave Remidi and John Galobich, former lead singer for "The Cryan Shames" Tom Doody (Toad) was contacted. With the addition of Don Melton on piano and John Pavletic on lead guitar, this new aggregation was called "The Ides and Shames Union". They toured under this name for approximately a year, and then expanded the group with former Shames member Jim Pilster (J.C. Hooke). In quick order, Chuck Soumar took his leave, and Ted Kalamatas replaced him on drums. Ted was soon replaced by former Shames drummer Ronnie Kaplan. Then lead player John Pavletic stepped down, and was replaced by former Shames lead guitarist Jim Fairs. With the addition of Randy Poiniatowski on Hammond organ, the group then changed its name back to "The Cryan Shames". They continued touring the US midwest until late 1977 and then disbanded.

Comeback 
In 1990, The Ides' home town of Berwyn offered to have the re-united group headline their "Summerfaire". The concert was attended by over 20,000 and the Ides returned to live performances. The following year they released their first new music since 1973, a four-song cassette EP entitled "Beware – The Ides of March". Trumpeter and backing vocalist Chuck Soumar is credited with being primarily responsible for reuniting the band.

In 1992, the album Ideology was released with re-recordings of "Vehicle", and "You Wouldn't Listen", plus new material.

In 1997, the five-track album "Age Before Beauty" was released, which included an instrumental of "Vehicle" and a new version of "Roller Coaster". And by 1998 the band wrote and released "Finally Next Year" to commemorate the Chicago Cubs' season. The song was included on a CD entitled The Cubs' Greatest Hits which was sold at all Major League ballparks. The song was used on many Cubs-themed radio and television programs.

Recent times 

By 2001, The Ides had expanded their schedule and returned to national touring. The band recorded a two-hour live performance for XM Satellite radio in Washington, D.C.. Also, "Vehicle" was used for an extensive national advertising campaign by General Motors.

A double live album, Beware: The Ides of March Live, captured their concert at the McAninch Center at the College of DuPage in Glen Ellyn, Illinois. This live set was released on Rhino Records in 2002. Handmade Records released Friendly Strangers, a double CD limited run set of the original Warner Bros. recordings.

In 2004, the Ides of March celebrated 40 years since their original formation, together with a series of multi-media shows emceed by Dick Biondi. The sold-out show at the Arcada Theatre in St. Charles, Illinois, can be seen on the DVD A Vehicle Through Time.

2005 saw "Vehicle" get further promotion when American Idol runner-up Bo Bice performed the song three times on the show. That same year, the Ides released their compilation CD, Ide Essentials. It included past hits ("Vehicle", and "You Wouldn't Listen") and versions of Survivor songs including "Eye of the Tiger", "High on You" and "Rebel Girl", as well as new material. It featured the new single "Come Dancing", and a re-release of the Ides' first recording "Like It or Lump It".

Up to date 
The Ides sang their Christmas carol "Sharing Christmas" to a capacity crowd at the 6 o'clock Mass at Chicago's Holy Name Cathedral in 2005, at the request of the church's pastor, Father Dan Mayall. They sang along with Dick Biondi and have continued to perform at the cathedral's 6:00 Christmas Eve Mass since then. A total of four Christmas songs were recorded by them and appeared on the Sharing Christmas album; copies were sold to raise funds for Holy Name Cathedral's Thursday Night Suppers.

In 2006, The Ides' first two albums, Vehicle and Common Bond, were nationally re-released on the Collector's Choice label. Sony BMG released Ides of March Extended Play nationally; the album was culled from the band's live recordings.

In September 2010, the City of Berwyn, Illinois, dedicated Home Avenue between Riverside Drive and Cermak Road (the location of J. Sterling Morton High School West, the school most of the band members attended) to "Ides of March Way" in tribute of the band.

Ray Herr (born Raymond J. Herr Jr. on September 24, 1947, in Arlington Heights, Illinois) died on March 29, 2011, in Hainesville, Illinois, from esophageal cancer at age 63.

John Larson (born on November 6, 1949, in Elgin, Illinois) died on September 21, 2011, in Warsaw, Indiana, from cancer at the age of 61.

Chuck Soumar quit the band in 2011 to pursue other interests.

In 2014, the Ides celebrated the 50th anniversary of the band. The original four members – Bergland, Borch, Millas and Peterik – are still playing together (after Peterik's hiatus to form Survivor). They have released a 50th anniversary career retrospective box set and a DVD called "Last Band Standing", and continue to write and record new music. At their anniversary concert on September 27, 2014, they received a citation from the State of Illinois honoring their achievement as well as their charity work (the band established a scholarship fund at their alma mater, Morton West High School in Berwyn, Illinois).

As of 2018, the band continues to tour, both by themselves and as part of the "Cornerstones of Rock" series where they act as the house band for a variety of 1960s-era Chicago-area bands. In 2019, The Ides of March released an album on both vinyl and CD, marking their 55th anniversary. The recording is entitled "Play On", and was released on the Ides of March Records label.

On September 23, 2021, The Ides of March celebrated over 57 years together, and their return to touring after the COVID-19 pandemic, with a concert at The Potawatomi Hotel and Casino in Milwaukee, WI. With well over 4,000 gigs together since 1964, and being a musical organization that has always included the original four members, The Ides of March have been called "The Longest Touring Original Band in Musical History".

Band members

Current members
 Jim Peterik – lead vocals, lead guitar, keyboards 
 Larry Millas – rhythm guitar, keyboards, bass guitar, vocals 
 Bob Bergland – bass guitar, tenor saxophone, vocals 
 Mike Borch – drums, percussion, vocals 
 Scott May – keyboards, vocals 
 Tim Bales – trumpet 
 Steve Eisen – alto saxophone, flute, percussion 
 Henry Salgado – trombone

Former members
 Steve Daniels – trumpet 
 Ray Herr – lead vocals, rhythm guitar, bass guitar 
 John Larson – trumpet, flugelhorn 
 Chuck Soumar – trumpet, percussion, vocals 
 Conrad Prybe – trombone 
 Dave Arellano – keyboards 
 Dave Stahlberg – trombone

Timeline

Discography

Albums

Singles

See also 
 List of 1970s one-hit wonders in the United States

References

External links 
Official website
Jim Peterik's website
Forgotten Hits: The Ides of March Get Their Way
 
 

Musical groups from Illinois
Musical groups established in 1964
1964 establishments in Illinois
Warner Records artists
RCA Records artists
Musical quartets